Hemanta Mukherjee Metro Station is a station of Line 6 of the Kolkata Metro at Ruby Crossing, serving the areas of Kasba and Anandapur. The station is named in honour of the Indian Bengali playback singer Hemanta Mukherjee.

See also
List of Kolkata Metro stations

Kolkata Metro stations
Railway stations in Kolkata